London Buses route 135 is a Transport for London contracted bus route in London, England. Running between Crossharbour ASDA and Moorfields Eye Hospital, it is operated by Stagecoach London.

History

Route 135 commenced operating on 24 May 2008 between Crossharbour and Old Street station. It was initially operated at a frequency of every 15 minutes off-peak and every 10 minutes during peak hours, with a maximum requirement of 13 double-deck buses. The initial contract to operate the route was awarded to Arriva London's Barking garage. The route was featured in Time Out magazine in 2009.

Upon being re-tendered, the route was awarded to Docklands Buses with the transfer occurring on 23 May 2015 and Alexander Dennis Enviro 400 bodied Volvo B5LHs introduced.

On 17 September 2016, it was rerouted through the Isle of Dogs to partly replace route D3.

Upon being retendered, operation the route was taken over by Tower Transit's Lea Interchange bus garage on 21 May 2022 using Wright Gemini 3 bodied Volvo B5LHs formerly used on route 328. The route was included in the sale of Lea Interchange bus garage to Stagecoach London on 25 June 2022.

Route description
The route links Crossharbour to Old Street, serving a number of intermediate points including Canary Wharf, Westferry, Limehouse, Aldgate and Hoxton. It is one of the two routes that provides the a direct bus link between Canary Wharf and the City of London, and serves a number of heavily cultural locations. Parts of the route provide an alternative to the Docklands Light Railway. The other route is the night route N550.

Current route
Route 135 operates via these primary locations:
Crossharbour DLR station 
Cubitt Town St John's Park
Island Gardens 
Mudchute station 
Masthouse Terrace Pier 
Millwall Sir John Mcdougal Gardens  
Canary Wharf DLR station  
Westferry station 
Limehouse station  
Stepney Arbour Square
Shadwell Watney Market
Aldgate East station 
Liverpool Street station    
Shoreditch High Street station 
Old Street station  
Moorfields Eye Hospital

Previous route 135
The route number 135 has previously been used twice; for a service between Forty Hill and Brimsdown, until September 1982, and from November 1987 for a service between Marble Arch and Archway via Camden Town. The second service was operated by Metroline after privatisation, and was withdrawn in December 2000, being replaced by extending route 88 to cover part of its route and increasing the frequency of route 134, which already ran over much of the 135 route.

References

External links

Timetable

Bus routes in London
Transport in the London Borough of Islington
Transport in the London Borough of Hackney
Transport in the City of London
Transport in the London Borough of Tower Hamlets